Baseball was one of the many sports which was held at the 2002 Asian Games in Busan, South Korea beginning on October 2, 2002.  Five East and Southeast Asian nations participated in the tournament. The competition took place at Sajik Baseball Stadium.

Schedule

Medalists

Squads

Results
All times are Korea Standard Time (UTC+09:00)

Preliminary

Final round

Semifinals

3rd–4th

Final

Final standing

References
 Japan Baseball

External links
 Official website

 
2002 Asian Games events
2002
Asian Games
2002 Asian Games